Almost Everyday is the sixth studio album by American indie electronic duo Matt and Kim. It was released on May 4, 2018, through Fader Label.

Background
In 2017, Kim suffered an ACL injury. The band cancelled the rest of their tour and took time off to focus on her recovery. In December 2017, the band revealed that during Kim's recovery, they wrote and recorded an album that was said to be their most personal album yet. They released four singles, "Forever", "Like I Used to Be", "Happy if You're Happy", and "Glad I Tried" and announced a spring tour to promote the album. They later announced that the album would be called Almost Everyday and revealed the album art and tracklist. The album features backing vocals from Mark Hoppus of blink-182, SWMRS, Flosstradamus, Santigold, Kevin Morby, Kevin Ray of Walk the Moon, Dave Monks of Tokyo Police Club, King Tuff, Clairo, Travis Hawley of Night Riots, HXLT, Van William of Waters, and Matt's brother, Fletcher C. Johnson.

"Almost Everyday" features Santigold, Walk The Moon bassist Kevin Ray, as well as singer Santigold and Night Riots' Travis Hawley.

Tour
A tour to support the album kicked off on March 23, 2018.

Singles
The first single, "Forever", was released on January 12, 2018, with a music video. "Like I Used to Be" was released as the second single on February 23, 2018, alongside a lyric video, and the revealing of the album's title, cover art, and tracklist. "Happy if You're Happy" was released as the third single on March 23, 2018, with a music video. The album went up for pre-order the same day. The fourth single, "Glad I Tried" was released on April 13, 2018.

Track listing

Charts

References

Matt and Kim albums
2018 albums
Fader Label albums